is a railway station in the city of Hirosaki, Aomori Prefecture, Japan, operated by the private railway operator, Kōnan Railway Company. The station's name is transliterated as "Titose" on its signage.

Lines
Chitose Station is served by the Kōnan Railway Ōwani Line, and lies 10.0 kilometers from the southern terminus of the line at Ōwani Station.

Station layout
Chitose Station has a single island platform with two tracks, connected to the station building by a level crossing. The station is attended only during morning and evening commuting hours.

Platforms

Adjacent stations

History
The station name was changed to its present name on April 1, 2008.

Surrounding area
The station is located in a residential area of Hirosaki

See also
 List of railway stations in Japan

External links

Kōnan Railway home page 
Location map 

Railway stations in Aomori Prefecture
Konan Railway
Hirosaki
Railway stations in Japan opened in 1952